Original was a catamaran built by Englishman Mayflower Crisp in Rangoon, Burma in the early 19th century.

See also
List of multihulls
Catamaran

References

Individual catamarans